John Kirk Davis (born January 5, 1963) is an American former Major League Baseball pitcher. He played during four seasons at the major league level for the Kansas City Royals, Chicago White Sox, and San Diego Padres. He was drafted by the Royals in the 7th round of the 1981 amateur draft.

References

1963 births
Living people
Major League Baseball pitchers
Kansas City Royals players
San Diego Padres players
Chicago White Sox players
Richmond Braves players
Nashville Sounds players
Baseball players from Chicago